Terrorism in Brazil has occurred since at least the 1940s.

Terror organizations

Shindo Renmei

The Shindo Renmei were a Japanese-Brazilian terror organization whose attacks were focused on resistance to the Japanese surrender at the end of World War II; attacks were perpetrated against other Japanese-Brazilians.

Islamic terror groups
According to the Brazilian Federal Police, at least seven Islamic terror groups operate in Brazil:
Al Qaeda
Jihad Media Battalion
Hezbollah
Hamas
Islamic Jihad
Al-Gama'a Al-Islamiyya
Moroccan Islamic Combatant Group
These groups operate inside the national territory and most are also known to operate on the border of Paraguay and Argentina with Brazil.

Under the Brazilian military government
During the Brazilian military government from 1964 to 1985, terrorism was a term frequently used by the state. All forms of opposition to the military regime were considered forms of terrorism; opposition members were deemed "terrorists."

An incident of right-wing terrorism known as the Riocentro attack occurred in 1981, perpetrated by a sector of the military dissatisfied with the democratic opening of the regime.

Recent history
On 21 July 2016, two weeks before the scheduled start of the Olympic Games, Brazilian Federal Police busted an Islamic jihadist terrorist ring plotting to wreak havoc in a manner similar to the 1972 Munich massacre, but they had a rather poor preparation compared to their objectives. 10 people suspected to be allied with ISIS werearrested and two more were on the run.

On 2 May 2017, Palestinian migrants threw a homemade bomb at far-right protesters, leaving several injured in São Paulo.

On 6 September 2018, the right-wing presidential candidate Jair Bolsonaro was stabbed during a political campaign in Juiz de Fora, Minas Gerais.

On 13 March 2019, two former students opened fire at a Brazilian school on Wednesday in Suzano, São Paulo. The pair killed at least five teenagers as well as two school officials before committing suicide in an attack that police said was inspired by the 1999 Columbine High School Massacre in the United States.

On 2 September 2021, a man who was planning Islamic terrorist attacks was arrested in Maringá.

Several newspapers, including O Globo, Veja, and Folha de S.Paulo, characterised the 2023 invasion of the Brazilian Congress as terrorism.

Responses and counterterrorism efforts
The Brazil government has four pieces of terrorism legislation pending in Congress:
 Visa denials – in 2011, legislation was introduced to deny visas to persons and/or expel foreigners convicted or accused of a terrorist act in another country;
 Terrorism during the World Cup – in 2011, legislation was introduced that deals with specific crimes, including terrorism, during and preceding the World Cup;
 Penal code update – legislation in 2012 sought to update the Brazilian penal code to include sentencing guidelines for terrorism crimes;
 Terrorism definitions – legislation in 2013 sought to define terrorism under the Brazilian Constitution.

Criticism
There is a large concentration of Middle Eastern immigrants in the area near the Paraguay, Argentina, Brazil border. Some authorities monitoring the area have stated that Brazil should participate more in the international fight against terrorism.

See also

Crime in Brazil

References